USS LST-918 was an  in the United States Navy. Like many of her class, she was not named and is properly referred to by her hull designation.

Construction
LST-918 was laid down on 5 April 1944, at Hingham, Massachusetts, by the Bethlehem-Hingham Shipyard; launched on 7 May 1944; and commissioned on 29 May 1944.

Service history
During World War II, LST-918 was assigned to the Asiatic-Pacific theater and took part in the Leyte landings in October 1944, and the assault and occupation of Okinawa Gunto in March and June 1945.

Following the war, LST-918 performed occupation duty in the Far East until early January 1946. Upon her return to the United States, she was decommissioned on 12 June 1946, and struck from the Navy list on 31 July, that same year. On 18 December 1947, the ship was sold to the Learner Co., Oakland, California, and subsequently scrapped.

Awards
LST-918 earned three battle star for World War II service.

Notes

Citations

Bibliography 

Online resources

External links
 

 

LST-542-class tank landing ships
World War II amphibious warfare vessels of the United States
Ships built in Hingham, Massachusetts
1944 ships